Order No. 227 was an order issued on 28 July 1942 by Joseph Stalin, who was acting as the People's Commissar of Defence. It is known for its line "Not a step back!" (Ni shagu nazad!), which became the primary slogan of the Soviet press in summer 1942.

The order established that each front must create one to three penal battalions (Shtrafbats), which were sent to the most dangerous sections of the front lines. From 1942 to 1945, a total of 422,700 Red Army personnel were sentenced to penal battalions as a result of courts-martial. The order also directed that each army must create "blocking detachments" at the rear that would shoot "panic-mongers and cowards". In the first three months, blocking detachments shot 1,000 penal troops and sent 24,000 to penal battalions. By October 1942, the idea of regular blocking detachments was quietly dropped.

Intended to galvanise the morale of the hard-pressed Red Army and emphasize patriotism, it had a generally detrimental effect and was not consistently implemented by commanders who viewed diverting troops to create blocking detachments as a waste of manpower. On 29 October 1944, blocking detachments were disbanded by Stalin's order No. 349 citing the changed situation at the front.

History
During the first part of the war on the Eastern Front, the Soviets suffered heavy losses along with mass retreat and desertion. Stalin released order No. 227 intending to re-establish discipline in the Red Army in the battle against the Wehrmacht and Waffen-SS:

It goes on to state that The Supreme General Headquarters of the Red Army commands:

Effect
Marshal of the Soviet Union, Aleksandr Vasilevsky, wrote: "...Order N 227 is one of the most powerful documents of the war years due to its patriotic and emotional content... the document was motivated by rough and dark times... while reading it we were thinking to ourselves if we were doing everything it takes to win the battle."

No commander had the right to retreat without an order. Anyone who did so was subject to a military tribunal of the corresponding seniority level.

Order No. 227 established that each front must create one to three penal battalions (commonly known as ) of up to 800  middle-ranking commanders and high-ranking commanders accused of disciplinary problems. Penal battalions were sent to the most dangerous sections of the front lines. Each front had to create penal companies for privates and NCOs. By the end of 1942 there were 24,993 troops serving in penal battalions, which increased to 177,694 in 1943. The number decreased over the next two years to 143,457 and 81,766 soldiers in 1944 and 1945, respectively. The total of Red Army personnel sentenced by courts-martial was 994,300, with 422,700 assigned to penal battalions and 436,600 imprisoned after sentencing. Not included are 212,400 deserters, who were not found and escaped the custody of the military districts.

The order also directed that each army must create "blocking detachments" (abbreviated to ) at the rear that would shoot "panic-mongers and cowards". Both measures were cited in the preamble of the order as having been successfully used by the Germans during their winter retreat.

In the first three months, blocking detachments shot 1,000 penal troops and sent 24,000 to penal battalions. According to an internal list of the NKVD from October 1942, 15,649 soldiers were picked up by the restricted forces who fled the front line on the Stalingrad Front from August 1, 1942 to October 15, 1942. Of these, 244 soldiers were imprisoned, 278 were shot, 218 were sent to penal companies, 42 to penal battalions and 14,833 to return to their units. By October 1942, the idea of regular blocking detachments was quietly dropped.

Intended to galvanise the morale of the hard-pressed Red Army and emphasize patriotism, it had a generally detrimental effect and was not consistently implemented by commanders who viewed diverting troops to create blocking detachments as a waste of manpower. On 29 October 1944, blocking detachments were disbanded by order No. 349 of the People's Commissar of Defence (Stalin) citing the changed situation at the front.

See also
 Order No. 270
 They shall not pass
 Battle of Stalingrad
 Last stand
 List of last stands

Notes

References 
 Sellas, Anthony (1992). The Value of Human Life in Soviet Warfare, New York: Routledge.
 History Channel, Monday 24 Nov 2008 @ 1400hr Eastern Time.

Further reading  

Eastern Front (World War II)
Government documents of the Soviet Union
1942 in the Soviet Union
Joseph Stalin